金湖, meaning "golden lake", may refer to:

In the Mandarin Chinese reading Jīnhú:
Jinhu County, Huai'an, Jiangsu, People's Republic of China
Jinhu, Kinmen, township in Fukien Province, Republic of China

In the Korean reading Geumho (also spelled Kǔmho):
Geumho-dong, Seungdong-gu, Seoul, South Korea
Geumho Station, Seoul Metro station in Geumho-dong, Seungdong-gu, Seoul, South Korea
Geumho-dong (Gwangju), Seo-gu, Gwangju, South Korea; see List of administrative divisions in Gwangju

See also
Places with the same meaning in other languages:
Gold Lake, California, United States
Golden Lake, Ontario, Canada
Golden Lake (Nova Scotia), Canada
Altyn-Köl, Altai Republic, Russia